"Forever Together" is a song co-written and recorded by American country music artist Randy Travis. It was released in September 1991 as the second single from his album High Lonesome.  It peaked at number 1 on both the Billboard Hot Country Singles & Tracks and the Canadian RPM country Tracks chart. It was co-written by Travis with fellow musician, Alan Jackson while they were on tour together.

Content
A non-album track, "This Day Was Made for You and Me", co-written by Travis and John Lindley, was a B-side on the 7" single.  The song was previously released as the B-side of Travis'  1989 single "It's Just a Matter of Time".

Musicians
As listed in liner notes.
 Eddie Bayers - drums
 Dennis Burnside - piano
 Steve Gibson - electric guitar
 Doyle Grisham - steel guitar
 Sherilyn Huffman - background vocals
 David Hungate - bass guitar
 Kyle Lehning - Wurlitzer
 Mac McAnally - acoustic guitar
 Brent Mason - electric guitar
 Mark O'Connor - fiddle
 Lisa Silver - background vocals
 Randy Travis - lead vocals
 Diane Vanette - background vocals
 Curtis Young - background vocals

Chart performance
"Forever Together" debuted at number 47 on the U.S. Billboard Hot Country Singles & Tracks for the week of September 28, 1991.

Year-end charts

References

 Allmusic
 CMT

1991 singles
Randy Travis songs
Songs written by Alan Jackson
Songs written by Randy Travis
Song recordings produced by Kyle Lehning
Warner Records singles
1991 songs